Der Zigeunerprimas (The Gypsy Band Leader, known as Sari and The Gypsy Virtuoso in English speaking countries) is a three-act operetta, which was composed by Emmerich Kálmán.

In 1929 it was adapted into a German silent film The Gypsy Chief directed by Carl Wilhelm.

Roles

Synopsis
Pali Rácz, a thrice-widowed gypsy violinist, is adored by women and hailed widely as a virtuoso. His daughter Sari cares for their large family. His young son Laczi is also a violinist, but has chosen to forsake his father's playing style and study classical violin at the Academy of Music. Pali wants to marry his niece, Juliska, as a companion in his old age, but she prefers his son, Laczi, and Laczi, in turn, loves her. Pali criticizes Laczi's musical talent so much, and Laczi yearns so for Juliska, that he leaves home. Reunited in Paris, father and son reconcile after Countess Irini, an old admirer, convinces Pali not to interfere with the course of Laczi and Juliska's relationship. Irini's grandson marries Sari.

Recordings 
 Josef Metternich, Julius Katona, Annemarie Jürgens, Daue,  – Westdeutscher Rundfunk – Franz Marszalek – 1949
 Thompson, Meacham, Lengfelder – Ohio Light Opera – McMahon – 2001 (0098).
 Gabriele Rossmanith, Edith Lienbacher, Roberto Saccà, ; Claus Peter Flor – Classic Produktion Osnabrück 058-2-2003

Radio adaptation
Sari was presented on The Railroad Hour on 17 March 1952. Baritone Gordon MacRae and soprano Margaret Truman starred in the episode, which also featured Carmen Dragon's orchestra and Norman Luboff's chorus.

Notes and references

Sources
Myers, Eric (2002). "Kalman: Der Zigeunerprimas. Opera News, October 2002

External links
Detailed synopsis and list of musical numbers for Der Zigeunerprimas at musicaltheatreguide.com
 

Operas by Emmerich Kálmán
German-language operettas
1912 operas
Operas set in Hungary
Fictional representations of Romani people
Operas adapted into films